Branko Radović (born 18 October 1950) is a Montenegrin former professional footballer, who played as a defender or midfielder, and manager.

Honours

Club
Red Star Belgrade
 Yugoslav First League: 1976–77
Atlanta Chiefs
 NASL Regular Season Premierships: 1979–80 Indoor

International
Yugoslavia
 Mediterranean Games: 1971

References

1950 births
Living people
Footballers from Podgorica
Association football defenders
Yugoslav footballers
Olympic footballers of Yugoslavia
Mediterranean Games medalists in football
Competitors at the 1971 Mediterranean Games
Mediterranean Games gold medalists for Yugoslavia
OFK Titograd players
Red Star Belgrade footballers
Colorado Caribous players
Atlanta Chiefs players
New Jersey Rockets (MISL) players
Cleveland Force (original MISL) players
Yugoslav First League players
National Professional Soccer League (1967) players
North American Soccer League (1968–1984) players
North American Soccer League (1968–1984) indoor players
Yugoslav expatriate footballers
Expatriate soccer players in the United States
Yugoslav expatriate sportspeople in the United States
Serbia and Montenegro football managers
FK Obilić managers
FK Mladost Lučani managers
FK Smederevo managers
Serbia and Montenegro expatriate football managers
Expatriate football managers in Vietnam
Viettel FC managers